Tricornis oldi, common name: Old's Conch, is a species of sea snail, a marine gastropod mollusk in the family Strombidae, the true conchs.

Description
The shell size varies between 80 mm and 150 mm.

Distribution
This species is distributed in the Arabian Sea along Oman, and in the Indian Ocean along Somalia.

References

 Walls, J.G. (1980). Conchs, tibias and harps. A survey of the molluscan families Strombidae and Harpidae. T.F.H. Publications Ltd, Hong Kong

External links
 

Strombidae
Gastropods described in 1965